Anthony Wesley Bowling  is an American voice actor and director who has provided voices and directed for English-language versions of Japanese anime films and television series at Funimation. Some of his major roles include Ukyo in Samurai 7, Shiro Ashiya / Alciel in The Devil Is a Part-Timer!, Shin Fukuhara in Baka and Test, Orito in Is This a Zombie?, Aoi Torisaki in Absolute Duo, and Junichiro Kagami, the title character in Ultimate Otaku Teacher.

Personal life 
Bowling is married to Noa Gavin.

Filmography

References

External links
 
 
 Anthony Bowling at CrystalAcids Voice Actor and Staff Database
 

1982 births
Living people
American male voice actors
People from El Paso, Texas
21st-century American male actors
Male actors from El Paso, Texas
American male film actors
American male television actors